Aumonier is a surname, and may refer to:

 Eric Aumonier (1899–1974), sculptor 
 Éric Aumonier (b. 1946), bishop
 James Aumonier (1832-1911), landscape painter
 Kate Aumonier, singer
 Stacy Aumonier (1877–1928), writer

French word aumônier means almoner.

See also
 Almoner